Paul Burgess (born 14 August 1979 in Perth, Western Australia) is an Australian pole vaulter who became only the thirteenth pole vaulter in the world to reach 6 metres.

Biography
Burgess was originally a gymnast, winning a silver medal at the Australian National Gymnastics Championships as a thirteen-year-old.  Having grown too tall to continue with gymnastics, testing at the Western Australian Institute of Sport suggested that Burgess was suited to pole vault.  By 1996, Burgess had won the gold medal at the 1996 Sydney World Junior Championships, clearing a then-personal best of 5.35 metres.  Later that year Burgess set the under 18 Australian record of 5.51 metres.  In 1998, Burgess finished second at the 1998 Commonwealth Games, third at the World Junior Championships and seventh at the World Cup.

Burgess finished second at the East Asian Games in 2001, clearing 5.50 metres.  In 2002, Burgess finished fifth at the World Cup, clearing 5.20 metres.

At his second Olympics, in 2004, Burgess finished eleventh at 5.55 metres, although he had cleared 5.70 metres in the qualifying rounds.

It was, however, in 2005 that Burgess's form improved dramatically, clearing 5.91 metres, 5.95 metres and then 6.00 metres in domestic competition.  These were, at the time, the three highest vaults on Australian soil.

Burgess ended the 2006 European season as the number two ranked pole vaulter (behind training partner Steven Hooker), having won the World Athletics Final on 10 September 2006.  Burgess won US$30,000 in the process.

He was named Western Australian Sports Star of the Year in January 2006.

See also
6 metres club

References

External links

1979 births
Athletes (track and field) at the 1998 Commonwealth Games
Athletes (track and field) at the 2002 Commonwealth Games
Athletes (track and field) at the 2006 Commonwealth Games
Athletes (track and field) at the 2000 Summer Olympics
Athletes (track and field) at the 2004 Summer Olympics
Athletes (track and field) at the 2008 Summer Olympics
Living people
Olympic athletes of Australia
Australian male artistic gymnasts
Australian male pole vaulters
Track and field athletes from Western Australia
Athletes from Perth, Western Australia
Western Australian Institute of Sport alumni
Commonwealth Games silver medallists for Australia
Commonwealth Games medallists in athletics
Medallists at the 1998 Commonwealth Games
Medallists at the 2002 Commonwealth Games